Zhetysu Stadium (Jetisý stadıony) is a multi-use stadium in Taldıqorğan, Kazakhstan, designed by Malaysian architect Michael KC Cheah.  It is currently used mostly for football matches and hosts the home matches of FC Zhetysu.

External links
Page from club website 

Football venues in Kazakhstan